The women's team competition in sumo at the 2001 World Games took place on 26 August 2001 at the Tenno Town Gymnasium in Tenno, Akita, Japan.

Competition format
A total of 6 teams entered the competition. They fought in stepladder system.

Results

Gold medal bracket

Bronze medal bracket

References

External links
 Sumo on IWGA website

Sumo at the 2001 World Games